This is a list of Irish American communities in the United States:

Major Irish American communities

Alabama
 Birmingham, Alabama
 Fackler, Alabama
 Tibbie, Alabama
 Bayou La Batre, Alabama
 Huntsville, Alabama
 Beaverton, Alabama
 Green Pond, Alabama
 Mobile, Alabama
 Joppa, Alabama
 Stapleton, Alabama
 Bellwood, Alabama
 Trafford, Alabama
 Waterloo, Alabama
 Anderson, Alabama
 Anniston, Alabama
 Axis, Alabama
 Bryant, Alabama
 Garden City, Alabama
 Riverside, Alabama
 Woodstock, Alabama
 Kennedy, Alabama
 Millerville, Alabama
 Logan, Alabama
 Jasper, Alabama
 Langston, Alabama
 Scottsboro, Alabama
 Cullman, Alabama
 Tuscaloosa, Alabama

Arkansas
 Little Rock, Arkansas
 Fort Smith, Arkansas
 Alleene, Arkansas
 Fouke, Arkansas
 Waldron, Arkansas
 Oil Trough, Arkansas
 Greenway, Arkansas
 Letona, Arkansas
 Caraway, Arkansas
 Pindall, Arkansas
 Langley, Arkansas
 Dyer, Arkansas
 Cherry Valley, Arkansas
 Concord, Arkansas
 Midland, Arkansas
 Blue Mountain, Arkansas
 Junction City, Arkansas
 Pine Bluff, Arkansas
 Huntsville, Arkansas
 Rockwell, Arkansas
 Piggott, Arkansas
 Corning, Arkansas
 Texarkana, Arkansas
 St. Francis, Arkansas
 Greenway, Arkansas
 Pollard, Arkansas
 McDougal, Arkansas
 Bigelow, Arkansas
 Perry, Arkansas
 Adona, Arkansas

California
 Irish Town, California (Butte County, California) (historic).
  Old Town Sacramento, California had an Irish community in late 19th century.
  East Sacramento;
 Petaluma, California
 Piedmont, California    
 San Francisco, California
 Mission District, historically Irish (particularly now Noe Valley neighborhood)
 Sunset District, San Francisco, California
 West Portal, San Francisco, California
  Dublin, California near Oakland.
 Los Angeles, California
 Downey, California, historically Irish; Southeast of Downtown LA.
 Santa Monica, California
 Palm Springs, California
 Southern Border region of San Diego County, California and Imperial Valley, many Irish came from Mexico to the USA.

Connecticut
 New Fairfield, Connecticut
 Fairfield, Connecticut
 Hartford, Connecticut
 New Haven, Connecticut
 West Haven, Connecticut
 Milford, Connecticut
 New London, Connecticut
 Mystic, Connecticut
 Hamden, Connecticut

Delaware
 Wilmington, Delaware
 Forty Acres, Wilmington
 Newark, Delaware
 Dover, Delaware

Georgia
 Atlanta, Georgia
 Edgewood, Atlanta
 Savannah, Georgia
 Macon, Georgia
 Augusta, Georgia
 Tate, Georgia
 Whitemarsh Island, Georgia
 Marble Hill, Georgia
 Cisco, Georgia
 Meridian, Georgia
 Sugar Valley, Georgia
 Morganton, Georgia
 Epworth, Georgia
 Hillsboro, Georgia
 Ellenton, Georgia
 Valdosta, Georgia
 Tyrone, Georgia
 Acworth, Georgia
 Blue Ridge, Georgia
 Dalton, Georgia
 Dublin, Georgia
 Columbus, Georgia
 Jonesboro, Georgia
 Duluth, Georgia
 Marietta, Georgia
 Athens, Georgia
 Statesboro, Georgia

Illinois
 Chicago
 Beverly, Chicago
 Bridgeport, Chicago
 Canaryville, Chicago
 Edison Park, Chicago
 Forest Glen, Chicago
 Mount Greenwood, Chicago
 Morgan Park, Chicago
 Wildwood, Chicago
 Chicago Metropolitan Area
 Chicago Ridge, Illinois
 Evergreen Park, Illinois
 Hometown, Illinois
 Manhattan, Illinois
 Merrionette Park, Illinois
 Oak Forest, Illinois
 Oak Lawn, Illinois
 Perry County, Illinois
 Todds Mill, Illinois
 Western Springs, Illinois
 Rockford

Indiana
 Irish Hill, Indianapolis
 Little Flower, Indianapolis
 Long Beach, Indiana
 Lawrenceburg, Indiana

Kansas
 Shawnee

Kentucky
 Irish Hill, Louisville
 Etoile, Kentucky
 Keene, Kentucky
 Dwale, Kentucky
 Letcher, Kentucky
 Knifely, Kentucky
 Meally, Kentucky

Louisiana
 Irish Channel, New Orleans
 Irish Bayou, New Orleans
 Columbia, Louisiana
 Grayson, Louisiana
 Denham Springs, Louisiana
 Lake Charles, Louisiana
 Mandeville, Louisiana
 Monroe, Louisiana
 Slidell, Louisiana
 Ardenville, Baton Rouge
 Albany, Louisiana
 Jonesboro, Louisiana
 Chatham, Louisiana
 Hodge, Louisiana
 Quitman, Louisiana
 Banks Springs, Louisiana
 Clarks, Louisiana
 Winnfield, Louisiana
 Joyce, Louisiana
 Dodson, Louisiana
 Calvin, Louisiana
 Olla, Louisiana
 Hester, Louisiana
 Tullos, Louisiana

Maine
 Portland, Maine

Maryland
 Locust Point, Baltimore
 Fells Point, Baltimore
 Canton, Baltimore

Massachusetts
 Boston - Home to largest Irish American population of a major city in the United States, according to the 2000 census
 West Roxbury
 Brighton (East of Commonwealth Ave and Oak Square)
 South Boston (Southie)
 Roslindale (West of Walworth St and Centre-South) 
 Back Bay
 Charlestown
 Dorchester (Savin Hill, Neponset and Cedar Grove) 
 Quincy home to the largest Irish American population of any city in the United States
  Squantum
  Houghes Neck
  Adams Shore
  German Town
 Arlington (sections of town nicknamed Mayoville, Little Galway, Little Sligo)
 East Arlington, Massachusetts 
 Medford
 Milton
 Newton 
 Somerville
 Easton
 Norton
 Mansfield
 Abington
 Whitman
 Rockland
 Melrose
 Reading, Massachusetts
 Chelmsford, Massachusetts
 Tyngsborough, Massachusetts
 Billerica, Massachusetts
 Tewksbury, Massachusetts
 Wilmington, Massachusetts
 Taunton:
 Weir Village
 Whittenton
 Lowell, Massachusetts (Centralville and Belvedere)
 Weymouth, Massachusetts
 Holyoke, Massachusetts - Originally known as Ireland Parish. (Smith’s Ferry and Rock Valley)
 Hingham, Massachusetts
 Hull, Massachusetts
 Cohasset, Massachusetts
 Norwell, Massachusetts
 Holbrook, Massachusetts
 Avon, Massachusetts
 Dedham, Massachusetts
 Westwood, Massachusetts
 Norwood, Massachusetts
 Medfield, Massachusetts
 Millis, Massachusetts
 Walpole, Massachusetts
 Foxboro, Massachusetts
 Braintree, Massachusetts
 North Scituate, Massachusetts
 Scituate, Massachusetts
 Marshfield, Massachusetts
 Duxbury, Massachusetts
 Green Harbor-Cedar Crest, Massachusetts
 Ocean Bluff-Brant Rock, Massachusetts
 North Pembroke, Massachusetts
 Natick, Massachusetts
 Westford, Massachusetts
 Woburn, Massachusetts
 Lynn, Massachusetts (Wyoma and Pine Hill)
 Worcester, Massachusetts (West Tatnuck, Indian Hill, Burncoat and Greendale)
 Franklin, Massachusetts

Michigan
 Detroit
 Corktown Historic District
 Oakland County, Michigan
 Hazel Park, Michigan
 Ferndale, Michigan
 Royal Oak, Michigan
 Berkley, Michigan
 Macomb County
 Roseville, Michigan
 St. Clair Shores, Michigan
 Eastpointe, Michigan
 Wayne County, Michigan
 Wyandotte, Michigan
 Southgate, Michigan
 Dearborn Heights, Michigan
 Livonia, Michigan

Minnesota
 St. Paul, Minnesota
 Rosemount, Minnesota

Mississippi
 Jackson, Mississippi
 Holly Bluff, Mississippi
 Southaven, Mississippi
 Chatawa, Mississippi
 Mize, Mississippi
 Horn Lake, Mississippi
 Bay Saint Louis, Mississippi
 Booneville, Mississippi
 Greenwood Springs, Mississippi
 Avon, Mississippi
 Sherman, Mississippi
 Stewart, Mississippi
 Biloxi, Mississippi
 Gulfport, Mississippi
 Mooreville, Mississippi
 Lake Cormorant, Mississippi
 Pearl, Mississippi
 Brandon, Mississippi
 Cleary, Mississippi
 Puckett, Mississippi
 Abbeville, Mississippi
 Hernando, Mississippi
 Corinth, Mississippi
 Marietta, Mississippi
 Eupora, Mississippi
 Mathiston, Mississippi
 Mantee, Mississippi
 Weir, Mississippi

Missouri
 Clayton/Tamm, St. Louis
 Dogtown, St. Louis
 Kansas City

Montana
 Butte, Montana

New Hampshire
 Manchester, New Hampshire
 Portsmouth, New Hampshire
 Dover, New Hampshire

New Jersey
 Hudson County
 Bayonne, New Jersey
 Jersey City, New Jersey
 Greenville, Jersey City
 Monmouth County, New Jersey
 Spring Lake, New Jersey
 Spring Lake Heights, New Jersey
 Sea Girt, New Jersey
 Manasquan, New Jersey
 Keansburg, New Jersey
 Brielle, New Jersey
 Lake Como, New Jersey
 Belmar, New Jersey
 Avon-by-the-Sea, New Jersey
 Union County, New Jersey
 Fanwood, New Jersey
 Bergen County, New Jersey
 Morris County, New Jersey
 Dover, New Jersey
 Chatham, New Jersey
 Denville, New Jersey
 Mine Hill, New Jersey
 Wharton, New Jersey
 Camden County
 Gloucester City, New Jersey
 Audubon Park, New Jersey
 Oaklyn, New Jersey
 Audubon, New Jersey
 Haddon Heights, New Jersey
 Barrington, New Jersey
 Glen Ridge, New Jersey
 Gloucester County, New Jersey
 Billingsport, New Jersey
 Oak Valley, New Jersey
 National Park, New Jersey
 Westville, New Jersey

New York
New York City
New York County (Manhattan)
Financial District
Tribeca, Manhattan
Flatiron, Manhattan
Chelsea, Manhattan
Hell's Kitchen, Manhattan
Lower East Side, Manhattan
Midtown Manhattan
Upper West Side, Manhattan
Inwood, Manhattan
Bronx County
Woodlawn Heights, Bronx
Throggs Neck, Bronx
Country Club, Bronx
City Island, Bronx
Bedford Park, Bronx
Kingsbridge, Bronx
Kingsbridge Heights, Bronx
Van Cortlandt Village, Bronx
Bedford Park, Bronx
Norwood, Bronx
Riverdale, Bronx
Parkchester, Bronx
Pelham Bay, Bronx
Kings County (Brooklyn)
Bay Ridge, Brooklyn
Gerritsen Beach, Brooklyn
Marine Park, Brooklyn
Vinegar Hill, Brooklyn
Windsor Terrace, Brooklyn
Queens County
Belle Harbor, Queens
Breezy Point, Queens
Oakland Gardens, Queens
Douglaston, Queens
Neponsit, Queens
Woodside, Queens
Sunnyside, Queens
Rockaway Beach, Queens
Rockaway Park, Queens
Roxbury, Queens
Broad Channel, Queens
Richmond County (Staten Island)
St. George, Staten Island
Westerleigh, Staten Island
Long Island, New York
Rockville Centre, New York
Valley Stream, New York
Bellerose, New York
Floral Park, New York
Garden City, New York
Williston Park, New York
Plandome, New York
Munsey Park, New York
Long Beach, New York
Point Lookout, New York
Island Park, New York
North Merrick, New York
Massapequa Park, New York
Sea Cliff, New York
Locust Valley, New York
Brookville, New York
Oyster Bay, New York
Babylon, New York
Northport, New York
East Northport, New York
Smithtown, New York
Bay Shore, New York
Brightwaters, New York
East Islip, New York
Sayville, New York
Blue Point, New York
Shoreham, New York
Wading River, New York
The Hamptons, New York
Montauk, New York
Westchester County, New York
Yonkers, New York
McLean Avenue
New Rochelle, New York
Pelham, New York
Pelham Manor, New York
Rye, New York
Bronxville, New York
Eastchester, New York
Scarsdale, New York
Hastings-on-Hudson, New York
Briarcliff Manor, New York
Cortlandt, New York
Croton-on-Hudson, New York
Rockland County, New York
Pearl River, New York
Stony Point, New York
Suffern, New York
Tipperary Hill, Syracuse
Buffalo
South Buffalo
Lockport
Greene County, New York
East Durham, New York
Albany, New York
Troy, New York
Schenectady County, New York
Saratoga Springs, New York
Ballston Spa, New York
Mechanicville, New York
 Ulster County, New York

Ohio
 Cleveland
 Irishtown Bend, Cleveland
 Kamm's Corners, Cleveland
 West Park, Cleveland
 Pleasant Ridge, Cincinnati
 Bridgetown, Cincinnati
 Price Hill, Cincinnati
 East End, Cincinnati
 Dublin, Ohio
 Fairview Park, Ohio
 Lakewood, Ohio
 Rocky River, Ohio

Pennsylvania
Philadelphia - Home to second-largest Irish American population of a major city in the United States according to the 2000 census
 Areas of South Philadelphia and Northeast Philadelphia - Largely Irish
Fishtown, Philadelphia
Kensington, Philadelphia
Areas of West Kensington, Philadelphia
Mayfair, Philadelphia
Bridesburg, Philadelphia
Port Richmond, Philadelphia
Frankford, Philadelphia
Juniata, Philadelphia
Harrowgate, Philadelphia
Holmesburg, Philadelphia
Oxford Circle, Philadelphia
Tacony, Philadelphia
South Philadelphia
Grays Ferry, Philadelphia, Pennsylvania
Pennsport, Philadelphia
2nd Street, Philadelphia
Devil's Pocket, Philadelphia
Areas of Girard Estate, Philadelphia
Southwest Center City, Philadelphia
Whitman, Philadelphia
Areas of Southwest Philadelphia
Delaware County
Drexel Hill, Pennsylvania
Havertown, Pennsylvania - Known as the "33rd county," a reference to the 32 counties of Ireland
Clifton Heights, Pennsylvania
Upper Darby, Pennsylvania
Aldan, Pennsylvania
Collingdale, Pennsylvania
Sharon Hill, Pennsylvania
Darby Township, Pennsylvania
Springfield, Pennsylvania
Ridley Park, Pennsylvania
Eddystone, Pennsylvania
Woodlyn, Pennsylvania
Folsom, Pennsylvania
Norwood, Pennsylvania
Prospect Park, Pennsylvania
Tinicum Township, Delaware County, Pennsylvania
Glenolden, Pennsylvania
Folcroft, Pennsylvania
East Lansdowne, Pennsylvania
Lansdowne, Pennsylvania
Brookhaven, Pennsylvania
Parkside, Pennsylvania
Village Green-Green Ridge, Pennsylvania
Marcus Hook, Pennsylvania
Bucks County
Bristol, Pennsylvania
Levittown, Pennsylvania
Montgomery County
Glenside, Pennsylvania
Conshohocken, Pennsylvania
Narberth, Pennsylvania
Pittsburgh
 Greenfield
 Lawrenceville
 Stanton Heights
 Brookline
 Carrick
 Sheraden
 Garfield
 Mount Washington
 Upper Lawrenceville
 Brighton Heights
 Perry South
 Knoxville
 Hazelwood
 Swissvale, Pennsylvania
 Dormont, Pennsylvania
 Wexford, Pennsylvania
 McMurray, Pennsylvania
 Castle Shannon, Pennsylvania
 Bethel Park, Pennsylvania
 White Oak, Pennsylvania
Northeastern Pennsylvania
Scranton, Pennsylvania
Minooka, Pennsylvania
Archbald, Pennsylvania
Wilkes-Barre, Pennsylvania
Pittston, Pennsylvania
Carbondale, Pennsylvania
Dunmore, Pennsylvania
Pottsville, Pennsylvania
Jim Thorpe, Pennsylvania
Clarks Summit, Pennsylvania
Clarks Green, Pennsylvania
Hughestown, Pennsylvania
Old Forge, Lackawanna County, Pennsylvania
Kingston, Pennsylvania
Avoca, Pennsylvania
Lehigh Valley
Easton, Pennsylvania
Bethlehem, Pennsylvania
Bangor, Pennsylvania

Rhode Island
 Pawtucket, Rhode Island
 Providence, Rhode Island
 Upper South Providence
 Cranston, Rhode Island
 Warwick, Rhode Island
 West Warwick, Rhode Island
 Newport, Rhode Island

South Carolina
 Charleston, South Carolina
 Greenville, South Carolina
 West Union, South Carolina
 Sandy Springs, South Carolina
 Liberty, South Carolina
 Myrtle Beach, South Carolina
 Spartanburg, South Carolina
 Westminster, South Carolina
 Pendleton, South Carolina
 Madison, South Carolina
 Donalds, South Carolina
 Antreville, South Carolina
 Lake Secession, South Carolina
 Norris, South Carolina
 Valley Falls, South Carolina
 Northlake, South Carolina
 Gaffney, South Carolina
 Ware Shoals, South Carolina

Vermont
 Burlington, Vermont

Virginia
 Norfolk, Virginia
 Ocean View (Norfolk)
 Willoughby Spit
 Virginia Beach, Virginia

Washington
 Burien, Washington

West Virginia
 Grant Town, West Virginia

Wisconsin
Appleton
Beloit
Fitchburg
Franklin
Janesville
La Crosse
Milwaukee
 Merrill Park, West Side
Madison
East Side
Mineral Point
Waterford
Westport

See also 
 Irish diaspora
 Ethnic enclave

References

Irish-American culture
Irish Americans